A number of ships have been named Gypsum Queen, including:

 , a British merchant ships sunk during World War II whilst a member of Convoy SC 42
 

Ship names